Ashim Das is an Indian Bengali nurse from Tripura. He received National Florence Nightingale Award in 2021 from Ramnath Kovind, the President of India for his outstanding contributions to the field of Clinical Nurses. He received the prestigious award while working at Manughat NPHC, Sabroom, South Tripura.

Awards 
 National Florence Nightingale Award 2020 (received in 2021)

References 

People from Tripura
Year of birth missing (living people)
Living people
Indian nurses